The 2015–16 season was Swansea City's 96th season in the English football league system, and their fifth consecutive season in the Premier League. Along with competing in the Premier League, the club also participated in the FA Cup and League Cup. The season covered the period from 1 July 2015 to 30 June 2016.

Squad and coaching staff information

First team squad

 
Ordered by 2015–16 squad numbers.

Club staff

Coaching staff

Source: Swansea City A.F.C.

Board of directors

Source: Swansea City A.F.C.

Transfers

Transfers in

Total outgoing:  £9,100,000

Transfers out

Total incoming:  £500,000

Loans out

Loans in

New contracts

Pre-season friendlies
On 29 April 2015, it was announced that Swansea City would feature in a Texas tournament in July. Subsequently, it was announced that this tournament had been cancelled. On 29 May, Swansea announced they will face Reading at Adams Park on 24 July. Swansea announced that they will travel to Germany to face Borussia Mönchengladbach and 1860 Munich. A trip to Nottingham Forest was added on 22 June.

Competitions

Overall

Overview

{| class="wikitable" style="text-align: center"
|-
!rowspan=2|Competition
!colspan=8|Record
|-
!
!
!
!
!
!
!
!
|-
| Premier League

|-
| FA Cup

|-
| League Cup

|-
! Total

Premier League

League table

Results summary

Results by matchday

Matches

The fixture list for the 2015–16 Premier League season was announced on 17 June 2015.

FA Cup

League Cup

Statistics

Appearances, goals and cards
Last updated on 15 May 2016

Overall summary

Summary

Score overview

References

Swansea City
Swansea City A.F.C. seasons
Swan